Keystone is an unincorporated community and census-designated place in central Keith County, Nebraska, United States. As of the 2010 census its population was 59.

Although Keystone is unincorporated, it has a post office, with the ZIP code of 69144.

Demographics

History
Keystone got its start following construction of the Union Pacific Railroad through the territory.  Keystone is one of numerous small habitations which Google Maps has never bothered to visit.

Historical site
Keystone is home to the Little Church at Keystone, designed by Thomas R. Kimball and built in 1908. The town was too small to hold two churches, so several community members funded the construction through bake sales.  The church has a Catholic altar on one end, a Protestant lectern at the other, and hinged pews to make the seats reversible.

References

Census-designated places in Keith County, Nebraska
Census-designated places in Nebraska